Robert John Harley (born 26 May 1990) is a Scotland international rugby union player for US Carcassonne in the Pro D2. He previously played for Glasgow Warriors and is their most capped player. He plays as a flanker but can also cover lock.

Rugby Union career

Amateur career

Harley was drafted to Glasgow Hawks in the Scottish Premiership for the 2017–18 season.

Harley was drafted to Currie in the Scottish Premiership for the 2018–19 season.

Professional career

Glasgow Warriors

He made his Warriors debut on 3 September 2010, winning at home against Leinster. He has the Glasgow Warrior No. 188.

A tough tackling back row and lock forward, Harley was a fan favourite.  Often underestimated to the cost of opposition teams and players. Harley provided teams with continuity of attacking ball and intelligence in defence, cutting off attacking options and space forcing opposition to run into numbers in defence.  Speed of thought in lineout play also assisted other players to shine with lineout steals due to his movement and lifting.  He was the first player to have played 200 times and 250 times for Glasgow Warriors as his unselfish play helps the team play better. Frequently overlooked at national level, he doesn't do the flash work often delivering what needs done for the whole game due to huge fitness and drive.   

Harley scored the first try of the 2014/15 Pro12 final which Glasgow Warriors went on to win. He gained his 200th cap for the Warriors on Sunday 13 January 2019 against Cardiff Blues in the European Champions Cup which they won 33 -24. He played his 250th game v Edinburgh in May 2021. His final season with the Warriors saw him end his tally on 267 caps, a club record.

US Carcassone

On 14 June 2022 it was announced that Harley had signed for French side Union Sportive Carcassonnaise in a two year deal.

International career

After some good performances for Glasgow in his debut season he earned a call up to the Scotland senior squad for the 2011 Six Nations Championship. Harley scored a match-winning try on his Scotland debut, against Samoa in June 2012.  He was picked throughout the 2015 6 Nations Championship.  His most recent cap was against Georgia in 2020.

References

External links

 Scrum profile
 GlagowWarriors.com profile
 GlasgowWarriors.org profile

1990 births
Living people
Scotland international rugby union players
Rugby union flankers
Rugby union locks
Glasgow Warriors players
Glasgow Hawks players
West of Scotland FC players
Currie RFC players
Scottish rugby union players
Rugby union players from Cheshire
US Carcassonne players